Michael D. Zimmerman (born 1943) is a prominent attorney, a former justice of the Utah Supreme Court, and a Zen teacher at Two Arrows Zen (TAZ) located in Salt Lake City, Utah.

His legal career is notable in a number of ways.  Zimmerman was the first graduate from the University of Utah Law School to clerk for the U.S. Supreme Court, working for Chief Justice Warren E. Burger.  He was then an early hire at O'Melvany & Meyers LLP in Los Angeles, where he worked for prominent lawyers including former Secretary of State Warren Christopher.  After returning to Utah, following the death of his father, Zimmerman worked as a professor at the University of Utah Law School, coaching the moot court team in written and oral appellate advocacy for half a dozen years.  He later became special counsel to Utah’s Governor Scott M. Matheson, and was a participant in both public policy advocacy and decision making. In 1984, in his early 40s, Zimmerman was appointed to the Utah Supreme Court.  During his 16-year tenure, he participated in the decision of several thousand cases, and served as chief justice of the Utah Supreme Court from 1993 until he stepped down to return to private practice.

In addition to being an accomplished attorney, Zimmerman is a Zen Buddhist teacher.  He received shiho from his teacher Dennis Genpo Merzel in December 2006. Zimmerman, the former Chief Justice of the Utah Supreme Court, is married to Diane Musho Hamilton (also a sensei at TAZ). As a justice he was known for his ethics, receiving in 1994 the "Excellence in Ethics Award" from the Center for the Study of Ethics at Utah Valley State College. Zimmerman had come to Zen Buddhism in 1993 seeking a support system for himself as his first wife Lynne battled terminal cancer.

Later, through his work in the courts, he met Diane and began sitting zazen at Kanzeon Zen Center with Merzel under Hamilton's suggestion. The two were married by Merzel in 1998. Zimmerman is currently a practicing attorney and partner at Zimmerman, Jones, and Booher in Salt Lake City. From 1984 to 2000 he served as a Justice for the Utah Supreme Court, and from 1994 to 1998 he acted as Chief Justice.

Biography
Michael Zimmerman was born in Chicago, Illinois in 1943. He attended university at the University of Utah, entering its law school and graduating first in his class.  He was also awarded order of the coif for his academic achievement.  Following graduation, Zimmerman moved to Washington, D.C. and worked as a judicial clerk for Warren E. Burger, then the acting Chief Justice of the United States Supreme Court. He then moved to Los Angeles, working as a lawyer for O’Melveny & Myers there. Zimmerman moved back to Utah to practice law for a short period, also serving as a special counsel to Utah Governor Scott Milne Matheson part time.  At the time of Zimmerman's joining in the Utah Supreme Court majority upholding prayers at government meetings as long as there was no religious restriction on who could give the prayer, Zimmerman was still an Episcopalian.

Zimmerman began a meditation practice in 1993 while his first wife, Lynne Mariani Zimmerman, was suffering a terminal illness.  She died the next year, in January 1994, after a year-long struggle with cancer. Zimmerman continued to serve as Chief Justice of the Utah Supreme Court during this time, while also raising their three daughters on his own.  In 1996, at the suggestion of Diane Hamilton, he began sitting zazen at Kanzeon Zen Center. In 1998 he received jukai and was given the Buddhist name of Mugaku ("no learning").  Later that year, he was married by his teacher, Dennis Genpo Merzel, to Diane Musho Hamilton. In December 2006 he received Dharma transmission from Dennis Genpo Merzel, giving him authority to teach Zen to others.

Awards
1988: Utah State Bar Appellate Judge of the Year
1994: Excellence in Ethics Award (Utah Valley State College)
1998: Distinguished Service Award from the Utah State Bar
2001: Honorary Doctor of Laws from the University of Utah

See also
Zazen
Dennis Genpo Merzel
Kanzeon Zen Center
Buddhism in the United States
Timeline of Zen Buddhism in the United States
List of law clerks of the Supreme Court of the United States (Chief Justice)

References

University of Utah alumni
Justices of the Utah Supreme Court
White Plum Asanga
Converts to Buddhism from Anglicanism
American former Protestants
Former Anglicans
Zen Buddhist spiritual teachers
American Zen Buddhists
Law clerks of the Supreme Court of the United States
1943 births
Living people
People associated with O'Melveny & Myers
Chief Justices of the Utah Supreme Court
S.J. Quinney College of Law alumni